For other bodies called Gendarmerie, see Gendarmerie (disambiguation).

For the concept, see Gendarmerie.

The gendarmerie are the uniformed branch of the cantonal police of the French-speaking cantons of Switzerland, and their members are not soldiers but civilians.

The first bodies of Swiss gendarmes have their origins in the foot gendarmes that served Napoleon Bonaparte during his stay in Switzerland, while this country was occupied by the French,

Currently, police authority is exercised by individual cantons, which are like Sovereign states. The cantonal police force is generally subdivided in two bodies:

 the gendarmerie, the uniformed organization in which performs the tasks of police patrol and response, and may conduct judicial enquiries.
 the sûreté, civil investigators who work in the Criminal Investigation Department (average and serious crime)

However, in certain cantons, the gendarmes have the ability to conduct local or judicial enquiries.

See also
Gendarmerie

Gendarmerie
Law enforcement agencies of Switzerland